Interviews is a Bob Marley interview album, with excerpts from songs. He is interviewed by Neville Willoughby. This was released by Tuff Gong in 1982 but did not receive an international Island release.

Track listing

Side one
"Natural Mystic"
"Trenchtown Rock"
"Redemption Song"
"Babylon System"
"Buffalo Soldier"
"Time Will Tell"

Side two
"Natural Mystic"
"Revolution"
"Survival"
"One Drop"
"Roots, Rock, Reggae"
"Guava Jelly"
"Rat Race"

Bob Marley and the Wailers compilation albums
1982 compilation albums
Island Records compilation albums